New York's 54th State Assembly district is one of the 150 districts in the New York State Assembly. It has been represented by Erik Martin Dilan since 2015.

Geography
District 54 is in Brooklyn. It encompasses Bushwick, Cypress Hills, and portions of East New York.

Recent election results

2022

2020

2018

2016

2014

2012

2010

References 

Politics of Brooklyn
54